The non-marine molluscs of Vietnam are a part of the molluscan fauna of Vietnam (wildlife of Vietnam). A number of species of non-marine mollusks are found in the wild in Vietnam.

There are good reasons to suppose that Vietnam, with a surface of 332,000 km2, a large variety of habitats, and many different limestone 'islands' that differ from each other in faunal composition, will have a rich diversity of terrestrial molluscs. Numerous non-marine mollusc species, including more than 850 species of land gastropods, have been described from the country but many others still await discovery and description.

Freshwater gastropods 
Freshwater gastropods in Vietnam include:

Neritidae
 Neritina violacea

Ampullariidae

 Pila polita
 Pila conica
 Pila ampullacea

 Pomacea canaliculata
 Pomacea insularum (d'Orbigny, 1835)

Viviparidae

 Cipangopaludina lecythoides
 Idiopoma umblicata
 Sinotaia aeruginosa
 Mekongia lithophaga
 Mekongia hainesiana
 Filopaludina sumatrensis
 Angulyagra polyzonata
 Angulyagra duchieri
 Angulyagra boettgeri

Pachychilidae

 Adamietta housei
 Adamietta reevei
 Brotia annamita
 Brotia dautzenbergiana
 Brotia hoabinhensis
 Brotia swinhoei
 Sulcospira collyra
 Sulcospira dakrongensis
 Sulcospira hainanensis
 Sulcospira proteus
 Sulcospira quangtriensis
 Sulcospira tonkiniana
 Sulcospira touranensis
 Sulcospira vietnamensis
 Semisulcospira aubryana
 Paracrostoma paludiformis

Paludomidae
 Paludomus messageri (Bavay & Dautzenberg, 1900)

Potamididae (brackish water snails)
 Cerithidea sp.

Thiaridae

 Melanoides tuberculata (O. F. Müller, 1774)
 Neoradina prasongi
 Sermyla requetii - synonym: Sermyla tornatela
 Tarebia granifera (Lamarck, 1822)
 Thiara scabra

Assimineidae

 Assiminea brevicula
 Assiminea francoisi
 Assiminea interrupta
 Assiminea obtusa
 Assiminea lutea

Bithyniidae

 Digoniostoma siamensis
 Parafossarulus striatulus - synonym: Parafossarulus manchouricus
 Alocinma longicornis
 Bithynia misella
 Bithynia fuchsiana
 Bithynia goniomphalos
 Wattebledia crosseana

Pomatiopsidae
 Neoprososthenia levayi - synonym: Paraprososthenia levayi
 Lacunopsis harmandi
 Tricula ovata
 Tricula similunaris
 Vietricula - 11 species

Stenothyridae

 Stenothyra divalis
 Stenothyra messageri
 Stenothyra monilifera
 Stenothyra polita
 Stenothyra cyrtochila
 Stenothyra ovata
 Stenothyra conica
 Stenothyra alba
 Stenothyra schlickumi Brandt, 1968

Iravadiidae (marine/brackish)
 Fluvicingula elegantula (A. Adams, 1861)
 Iravadia cochinchinensis (Bavay & Dautzenberg, 1910)
 Iravadia ornata Blanford, 1867
 Iravadia quadrasi (O. Boettger, 1893)
 Iravadia rohdei (Brandt, 1968)
 Pseudomerelina mahimensis (Melvill, 1893)
 Hyala sp.

Buccinidae
 Clea helena (Meder in Philippi, 1847)

Lymnaeidae
 Austropeplea viridis (Quoy & Gaimard, 1832)
 Radix auricularia (Linnaeus, 1758) - synonym: Lymnaea swinhoei
 Radix rubiginosa (Michelin, 1831)

Planorbidae
 Polypylis hemisphaerula (Benson, 1842)
 Gyraulus convexiusculus (Hutton, 1849)

Land gastropods 
Land gastropods in Vietnam include:

Cyclophoridae
 Chamalycaeus depressus (Bavay et Dautzenberg, 1912)
 Chamalycaeus fraterculus (Bavay et Dautzenberg, 1900)
 Chamalycaeus heudei (Bavay et Dautzenberg, 1900)
 Chamalycaeus paviei (Bavay et Dautzenberg, 1912)
 Dioryx compactus (Bavay et Dautzenberg, 1900)
 Dioryx messageri (Bavay et Dautzenberg, 1900)
 Dioryx vanbuensis (Bavay et Dautzenberg, 1900)
 Laotia christahemmenae Páll-Gergely, 2014
 Cyclophorus affinis Theobald, 1858
 Cyclophorus amoenus (Pfeiffer, 1854)
 Cyclophorus aquilus (Sowerby, 1843)
 Cyclophorus aurantiacus pernobilis Gould, 1844
 Cyclophorus bensoni (Pfeiffer, 1854)
 Cyclophorus cambodgensis Morlet, 1884
 Cyclophorus cantori (Benson, 1851)
 Cyclophorus clouthianus Möllendorff, 1882
 Cyclophorus consociatus Smith, 1893
 Cyclophorus courbeti Ancey, 1888
 Cyclophorus courbeti courbeti Ancey, 1888
 Cyclophorus courbeti leucostoma Dautzenberg et Fischer, 1905
 Cyclophorus cucphuongensis Oheimb, 2019
 Cyclophorus cryptomphalus Benson, 1857
 Cyclophorus dilatatus Heude, 1886
 Cyclophorus dodrans dodrans Mabille, 1887
 Cyclophorus dodrans fasciatus Kobelt, 1908
 Cyclophorus donghoiensis Thach et Huber, 2017
 Cyclophorus eudeli Smith, 1893
 Cyclophorus expansus (Pfeiffer, 1853)
 Cyclophorus fargesianus Heude, 1885
 Cyclophorus fasciatus Kobelt, 1908
 Cyclophorus floridus (Pfeiffer, 1854)
 Cyclophorus fruhstorferi fruhstorferi Möllendorff, 1901
 Cyclophorus fruhstorferi langsonensis Kobelt, 1908
 Cyclophorus fulguratus Pfeiffer, 1852
 Cyclophorus haughtoni Theobald, 1858
 Cyclophorus herklotsi Martens, 1861
 Cyclophorus huberi Thach, 2016
 Cyclophorus ignilabris Möllendorff, 1901
 Cyclophorus implicatus Bavay et Dautzenberg, 1908
 Cyclophorus implicatus implicatus Bavay et Dautzenberg, 1908
 Cyclophorus implicatus kanhoensis Do et Do, 2019
 Cyclophorus jourdyi Morlet, 1886
 Cyclophorus labiosus (Pfeiffer, 1854)
 Cyclophorus malayanus (Benson, 1852)
 Cyclophorus mansuyi Dautzenberg et Fischer, 1908
 Cyclophorus martensianus Möllendorff, 1874
 Cyclophorus massiei Morlet, 1891
 Cyclophorus monachus (Morelet, 1866)
 Cyclophorus muspratti Godwin-Austen et Beddome, 1894
 Cyclophorus orthostylus Möllendorff, 1898
 Cyclophorus paracucphuongensis Oheimb, 2019
 Cyclophorus paviei Morlet, 1884
 Cyclophorus pfeifferi Reeve, 1861
 Cyclophorus phongnhakebangensis Oheimb, 2019
 Cyclophorus polystictus Möllendorff, 1901
 Cyclophorus pyrostoma Möllendorff, 1882
 Cyclophorus saturnus Pfeiffer, 1862
 Cyclophorus siamensis (Sowerby, 1850)
 Cyclophorus songmaensis Morlet, 1891
 Cyclophorus speciosus (Philippi, 1847)
 Cyclophorus subfloridus Ancey, 1888
 Cyclophorus takumisaitoi Hirano, 2019
 Cyclophorus tamdaoensis Do et Do, 2019
 Cyclophorus tetrachrous Mabille, 1887
 Cyclophorus theodori Ancey, 1888
 Cyclophorus tornatus Morlet, 1892
 Cyclophorus trouiensis trouiensis Wattebled, 1886
 Cyclophorus trouiensis bendei Varga, 1972
 Cyclophorus trouiensis omphalotropis Möllendorff, 1900
 Cyclophorus unicus Mabille, 1887
 Cyclophorus volvulus (O.F. Müller, 1774)
 Cyclophorus zebrinus (Benson, 1836)
 Cyclotus lubricus (Dautzenberg et Fischer, 1908)
 Japonia fischeri (Morlet, 1886)
 Japonia scissimargo (Benson, 1856)
 Platyrhaphe leucacme Möllendorff, 1901
 Platyraphe sordida (Pfeiffer, 1855)
 Pterocyclos prestoni Bavay et Dautzenberg, 1909
 Rhiostoma morleti Dautzenberg et Fischer, 1905
 Scabrina laciniana (Heude, 1885)
 Scabrina locardi (J. Mabille, 1887)
 Scabrina tonkiniana (J. Mabille, 1887)
 Scabrina vanbuensis (Smith, 1896)

Diplommatinidae
 Diplommatina balansai Morlet, 1886
 Diplommatina clausilioides Bavay et Dautzenberg, 1912
 Diplommatina demangei Bavay et Dautzenberg, 1912
 Diplommatina messageri Ancey, 1903

Pupinidae
 Pupina anceyi Bavay & Dautzenberg, 1899
 Pupina billeti Fischer, 1898
 Pupina brachysoma Ancey, 1903
 Pupina dorri Dautzenberg, 1893
 Pupina douvillei Dautzenberg & Fischer, 1905
 Pupina exclamationis Mabille, 1887
 Pupina flava Möllendorff, 1884
 Pupina illustris Mabille, 1887
 Pupina laffonti Ancey, 1899
 Pupina solidula Möllendorff, 1901
 Pupina sonlaensis Do, 2017
 Pupina thaitranbaii Do, 2017
 Pupina tonkiana Bavay & Dautzenberg, 1899
 Pupina verneaui Dautzenberg & Fischer, 1905
 Pupina vescoi Morelet, 1862
 Pseudopomatias amoenus Möllendorff, 1885
 Pseudopomatias maasseni Páll-Gergely et Hunyadi, 2015
 Pseudopomatias sophiae Páll-Gergely, 2015
 Pupinella mansuyi (Dautzenberg et Fischer, 1908)
 Rhaphaulus tonkinensis Páll-Gergely, 2014
 Streptaulus longituba Páll-Gergely & Gargominy, 2017

Helicinidae
 Geotrochatella jourdyi Dautzenberg, 1895

Hydrocenidae
 Georissa decora Möllendorff, 1900

Clausiliidae
 Castanophaedusa fontainei Páll-Gergely & Szekeres, 2017
 Castanophaedusa huberi (Thach, 2016)
 Garnieria mouhoti nhuongi Do, 2015
 Grandinenia ardouiniana (Heude, 1885)
 Grandinenia tonkinensis (Nordsieck, 2010)
 Hemiphaedusa babeensis crassitesta Nordsieck, 2011
 Hemiphaedusa porphyrostoma regina Nordsieck, 2011
 Hemiphaedusa thatkheana ptychostoma Nordsieck, 2011
 Hemiphaedusa thatkheana splendida Nordsieck, 2011
 Leptacme cuongi Maassen & Gittenberger, 2007
 Leptocochlea sykesi lethrungtongi Grego & Szekeres, 2011
 Liparophaedusa leptotesta Nordsieck, 2011
 Megalauchenia soror Nordsieck, 2011
 Messageriella gargominyi Páll-Gergely & Szekeres, 2017
 Oospira abstrusa Szekeres, 1970
 Oospira abstrusa ginkae Grego & Szekeres, 2014
 Oospira duci Maassen & Gittenberger, 2007
 Oospira duci khanhi Nordsieck, 2011
 Oospira haivanensis Chinh & Szekeres, 2019
 Oospira naggsi Luong & Szekeres, 2014
 Oospira naggsi naggsi Luong & Szekeres, 2014
 Oospira naggsi parva Páll-Gergely & Szekeres, 2017
 Oospira oviformis Nordsieck, 2011
 Oospira pyknosoma Gittenberger & Vermeulen, 2001
 Oospira smithi Maassen & Gittenberger, 2007
 Oospira triptyx Nordsieck, 2011
 Phaedusa cochinchinensis (Pfeiffer, 1841)
 Phaedusa lypra pereupleura Nordsieck, 2011
 Phaedusa micropaviei Nordsieck, 2011
 Synprosphyma oospiroides Nordsieck, 2011
 Tropidauchenia bavayi senescens Nordsieck, 2011
 Tropidauchenia (Euryauchenia) fisheri phasmoides Grego & Szekeres, 2011
 Tropidauchenia ootanii longicollis Nordsieck, 2011
 Tropidauchenia palatalis Nordsieck, 2011

Helicarionidae
 Falsiplecta integripedia Schileyko & Semenyuk, 2018
 Laocaia attenuata Kuzminykh, 1999
 Laocaia obesa Kuzminykh, 1999
 Laocaia simovi Dedov & Schneppat, 2019

Streptaxidae - 39 species of Streptaxidae are known from Vietnam
 Discartemon
 Indoartemon
 Perrottetia aberrata (Souleyet, 1852)
 Perrottetia cristatellus (Möllendorff, 1901)
 Perrottetia daedaleus (Bavay & Dautzenberg, 1908)
 Perrottetia dugasti (Morlet, 1892)
 Perrottetia gudei (Fulton, 1915)
 Perrottetia hongthinhae D.-S. Do, 2017
 Perrottetia mabillei (Bavay et Dautzenberg, 1903)
 Perrottetia messageri (Bavay et Dautzenberg, 1908)
 Perrottetia oppidulum (Bavay et Dautzenberg, 1908)
 Perrottetia simonianus (Heude, 1890)
 Stemmatopsis arcuatolabris Do, 2021
 Stemmatopsis nangphaiensis Do & Do, 2015
 Stemmatopsis vanhoensis Do & Do, 2015
 Haploptychius
 Oophana
 Elma Adams, 1866
 Huttonella

Plectopylidae - 16 species are known from Vietnam

 Gudeodiscus anceyi (Gude, 1901)
 Gudeodiscus cyrtochilus (Gude, 1909)
 Gudeodiscus dautzenbergi (Gude, 1901)
 Gudeodiscus fischeri (Gude, 1901)
 Gudeodiscus francoisi (Fischer, 1898)
 Gudeodiscus giardi (Fischer, 1898)
 Gudeodiscus hemmeni Páll-Gergely & Hunyadi, 2015
 Gudeodiscus infralevis (Gude, 1908)
 Gudeodiscus messageri (Gude, 1909)
 Gudeodiscus phlyarius (Mabille, 1887)
 Gudeodiscus suprafilaris (Gude, 1908)
 Gudeodiscus villedaryi (Ancey, 1888)
 Gudeodiscus emigrans (Möllendorff, 1901)
 Halongella fruhstorferi (Möllendorff, 1901)
 Halongella schlumbergeri (Morlet, 1886)
 Sicradiscus mansuyi (Gude, 1908)

Philomycidae
 Meghimatium bilineatum (Benson, 1842)

Ariophantidae
 Hemiplecta jensi Páll-Gergely, 2019
 Parmarion martensi Simroth, 1894 
 Parmarion pupillaris Humbert, 1864

Agriolimacidae
 Deroceras laeve (O. F. Müller, 1774)

Camaenidae
 Amphidromus cambojiensis (Reeve, 1860)
 Amphidromus ingens Möllendorff, 1900
 Amphidromus naggsi Thach & Huber, 2014

Freshwater bivalves
Freshwater bivalves in Vietnam include:

See also
 List of marine molluscs of Vietnam

Lists of molluscs of surrounding countries:
 List of non-marine molluscs of China
 List of non-marine molluscs of Laos
 List of non-marine molluscs of Cambodia

References
This article incorporates CC-BY-3.0 text from the reference

Further reading 
 Do D. S., Nguyen T. H. T. & Do V. N. (2015). "A checklist and classification of terrestrial prosobranch snails from Son La, north-western Vietnam". Ruthenica 25(4): 117–132. PDF.
 Vermeulen J. J. & Whitten T. (1998). "Land and freshwater molluscs of the karst regions ENE of Haiphong and the Cuc Phuong National Park, northern Vietnam". Report of a survey for the Vietnam Programme of FFI 12 pp. (unpublished report).
 Vermeulen J. J. & Maassen W. J. M. (2003). "The non-marine mollusk fauna of the Pu Luong, Cuc Phuong, Phu Ly, and Ha Long regions in northern Vietnam". Report of a survey for the Vietnam Programme of FFI 35 pp. (unpublished report).

Molluscs
Vietnam
Vietnam